Adine may refer to:

People
 Adine Fafard-Drolet (1876–1963), Canadian soprano
 Adine Masson, French tennis player
 Adine Riom (1818–1899), French writer
 Adine Wilson (born 1979), New Zealand netball representative

Places
 Adine, Gaiole in Chianti, Italy